The Monte Stello massif is a chain of mountains in the island of Corsica, France, that forms the spine of the northern peninsula, Cap Corse.
It takes its name from Monte Stello, which was long thought to be the highest peak, but more recently it has been determined that Cima di e Follicie is the highest.

Geography
The Monte Stello massif constitutes the mountain spine of Cap Corse, at the northeastern end of the island. 
The Col de Santo Stefano, or Santo Stefano pass, provides a route from the Mediterranean coast to the Tyrrhenian coast of Corsica.
It divides the Monte Stello massif from the Monte Astu massif, both part of "Schistose Corsica" in the northeast of the island.
The Lugo or Campodata stream rises on the western slope of the pass, a tributary of the Aliso River, and the Bevinco river flows through the Lancone gorge on the eastern side.

Peaks
The main peaks are:

Gallery

Notes

Sources

Mountains of Haute-Corse
Massifs of Corsica